Romands are a Gallo-Romance ethnic group native to Romandy, in western Switzerland. Traditionally they spoke Franco-Provençal, as well as Frainc-Comtou in Canton of Jura. These languages have fallen into disuse in favor of the standard French language. The Romands descend largely from the Gallo-Romans and the Burgundians. They are referred to by Swiss Germans as Welsche.

References 

Romance peoples
Ethnic groups in Switzerland
Swiss people
Society of Switzerland